Gombi is the Local Government Headquarter of Gombi Local Government Area of Adamawa State, Nigeria.

"The area has been attacked in the past by Boko Haram and the region has been under a military state of emergency since May 2013."

In July 2014, a German development worker was kidnapped in the town of Gombi.

References 

Local Government Areas in Adamawa State